The Headquarters of the Supreme Commander-in-Chief is the highest command and control body for the troops and individual branches of the Armed Forces of Ukraine, as well as law enforcement services and agencies of Ukraine, which are part of the Armed Forces, formed by decree of the President of Ukraine No. 72/2022 dated February 24, 2022 in response to the Russian invasion of Ukraine on that day.

Structure and headquarters personnel 
Chairman – President Volodymyr Zelensky
Headquarters Coordinator of the Supreme Commander – Oleksiy Danilov, Secretary of the National Security and Defense Council
Other Members:
 Vasyl Maliuk, Acting Head of the Security Service of Ukraine
 Kyrylo Budanov, Head of the Chief Directorate of Intelligence of the Ministry of Defence of Ukraine
 Hryhoriy Halahan, Commander of the Special Operations Forces
 Yuriy Halushkin, Commander of the Territorial Defense Forces 
 Serhiy Deyneko, Chairman of the State Border Guard Service of Ukraine
 Andriy Yermak, Head of the Office of the President of Ukraine
 Valerii Zaluzhnyi, Commander-in-Chief of the Armed Forces of Ukraine
 Ihor Klymenko, Head of the National Police of Ukraine
 Sergio Kruk, Chairman of the State Emergency Service of Ukraine
 Dmytro Kuleba, Minister of Foreign Affairs
 Yuriy Lebed, Commander of the National Guard of Ukraine
 Oleksandr Litvinenko, Chairman of the Foreign Intelligence Service of Ukraine
 Maxim Mirgorodsky, Commander of the Ukrainian Air Assault Forces
 Denys Monastyrsky, Minister of Internal Affairs of Ukraine
 Oleksiy Reznikov, Minister of Defense of Ukraine
 Serhiy Rud, Head of the State Security Administration
 Ruslan Stefanchuk, Chairman of the Verkhovna Rada
 Denys Shmyhal, Prime Minister of Ukraine
 Yuriy Shchigol, Director of Derzhspetszviazok

See also

References 

Joint military headquarters
Military of Ukraine
Military units and formations of Ukraine
Military units and formations of the 2022 Russian invasion of Ukraine